EDT may refer to:

Science and technology 
 1,2-Ethanedithiol, compound commonly used for cleavage during peptide synthesis
 EDT (Digital), text editor for PDP-11 and VAX/VMS computer systems
 EDT (Univac), text editor for UNIVAC Series 90 and Fujitsu BS2000 computer systems
 EDT Hub, electronic document transmission software
 Electrodynamic tether, a spacecraft component
 Event dispatching thread, in Java

Time zones 
 Australian Eastern Daylight Time (UTC+11)
 Eastern Daylight Time (UTC−4), in North America

Other uses 
 Chicago Engineering Design Team, a robotics team
 Eau de toilette
 Electronic Disturbance Theater, an activist and artist collective
 Evidential decision theory, a school of thought within decision theory
 Event-driven trading, institutional investors attempt to profit from a stock mispricing that may occur during or after a corporate event.

See also
 EDTF (disambiguation)